Jack Hogan (born Richard Roland Benson Jr.; November 24, 1929) is an American retired actor. He is most notable for the role of PFC William G. Kirby on the 1960s television show Combat!

Biography
Born in Chapel Hill, North Carolina, Hogan was an architecture student in college before joining the Air Force, where he became a staff sergeant during the Korean War. After he returned to civilian life, he studied drama at the Pasadena Playhouse and in New York. He worked part-time as a lifeguard until he gained the role on Combat. He portrayed Sgt. Jerry Miller on the NBC-TV crime drama Adam-12. In addition to acting, he was a casting director for Magnum, P.I. and operated a building business.

Marriage
Hogan married Barbara Bates (not to be confused with actress Barbara Bates).

Films 
 Man from Del Rio (1956)
 The Bonnie Parker Story (1958)
 Paratroop Command (1959)
 The Legend of Tom Dooley (1959)
 The Cat Burglar (1961)

Television 

 Harbor Command (1957)
 Tombstone Territory Episode "Ride Out at Noon" (1957)
 Sea Hunt (1958–1959)
 Rifleman (1959) (Sea. 1, Ep. 36)
 Bat Masterson (1959) (Sea. 1, Ep. 34) as Jack and (Sea. 2, Ep. 1) as Stuart Chancellor
 Laramie (1959) (Sea. 1 Ep. 9)
 Ripcord, episode "Radar Rescue", (1961)
 Lawman (1961) The Juror 
 Bat Masterson (1961) 
 [[Cheyenne (TV series) (11/20/1961)"Storm Center"
(Sea. 3, Ep. 26) "Ledger if Guilt" as Marshall Johnny Dillon
 Rifleman (1962)
 Combat! (1962–1967) (112 ep.)
 Garrison's Gorillas (1968)
 Adam-12 Hawaii Five-O (1973-1976)
 Houston, We've Got a Problem (1974)
 Sierra (1974)
 The Specialists (1975)
 Mobile One (1975)
 Jake and the Fatman'' (1989–1990)

References

External links

1929 births
American male film actors
American male television actors
Male actors from North Carolina
People from Chapel Hill, North Carolina
Living people
20th-century American male actors